Lyudmila Vityukova (born 12 October 1978) is a Belarusian gymnast. She competed in five events at the 1996 Summer Olympics.

References

External links
 

1978 births
Living people
Belarusian female artistic gymnasts
Olympic gymnasts of Belarus
Gymnasts at the 1996 Summer Olympics
People from Babruysk
Sportspeople from Mogilev Region